Hauts Lyonnais is a football club based in Pomeys, France. Founded in 2012, it competes in the Championnat National 3, the fifth tier of the French football pyramid. The club's colours are violet and light blue.

Squad

References 

Association football clubs established in 2012
2012 establishments in France
Sport in Rhône (department)
Football clubs in Auvergne-Rhône-Alpes
Hauts Lyonnais